John Bourke, 4th Earl of Mayo, GCH, PC (Ire) (18 June 1766 – 23 May 1849) was an Irish peer and courtier, styled Lord Naas from 1792 to 1794, who served as Chairman of Committees in the Irish House of Lords until 1801.

Career

He was the eldest son of Joseph Deane Bourke, 3rd Earl of Mayo (Archbishop of Tuam 1782–94) and his wife, Elizabeth, daughter of Sir Richard Meade, 3rd Baronet. 

He succeeded to his father's titles on the death of his father on 20 August 1794. Before the Act of Union, he was Chairman of Committees in the Irish House of Lords; as compensation from the abolition of the House in 1801, he was awarded an annual pension of £1332. 

On 20 February 1810, he was sworn of the Privy Council of Ireland and was elected an Irish representative peer on 2 March 1816. On 11 May 1819, he represented the Duke of Clarence and St Andrews (later William IV) at the baptism of Prince George of Cambridge in Hanover and was appointed a GCH that year. 

At the coronation of George IV on 19 July 1821, he carried the Standard of Hanover.

Family
On 24 May 1792, Mayo had married Arabella Mackworth-Praed; they had no children. He died at Bersted Lodge, South Bersted, Sussex, the home of Susan Smith née Mackworth-Praed his sister in law and widow of Thomas Smith of Bersted Lodge (brother of Sir John Smith Burgess, Bart), and his titles passed to his nephew, Robert.

Arms

References

1766 births
1849 deaths
Naas, John Bourke, Lord
Irish representative peers
Members of the Parliament of Ireland (pre-1801) for County Kildare constituencies
Members of the Privy Council of Ireland
John
Earls of Mayo